White City (Radomsky) Airport, formerly , is located  east of White City, Saskatchewan, Canada.

See also 
List of airports in Saskatchewan
List of defunct airports in Canada

References

Defunct airports in Saskatchewan
Edenwold No. 158, Saskatchewan